The women's tournament competition of the beach volleyball events at the 2011 Pan American Games will take place between 16–21 of October at the Pan American Beach Volleyball Stadium. The defending Pan American Games champion is Juliana Felisberta & Larissa França of Brazil.

Each of the 16 pairs in the tournament was placed in one of four groups of four teams apiece, and played a round-robin within that pool. The top two teams in each pool advanced to the Quarterfinals. The third along with the fourth-placed teams in each group, were eliminated.

The 8 teams that advanced to the elimination rounds played a single-elimination tournament with a bronze medal match between the semifinal losers.

Schedule

Preliminary round
All times are Central Standard Time (UTC−06:00)

Group E

|}

Group F

|}

Group G

|}

Group H

|}

Elimination stage

Quarterfinals

Semifinals

Bronze medal match

Gold medal match

References

Beach volleyball at the 2011 Pan American Games